L'Amore (transl. "Love") is a 1948 Italian drama anthology film directed by Roberto Rossellini starring Anna Magnani and Federico Fellini. It consists of two parts, The Human Voice (Una voce umana), based on Jean Cocteau's 1929 play of the same title, and The Miracle (Il miracolo), based on Ramón del Valle-Inclán's 1904 novel Flor de santidad. The second part was banned in the United States until it was cleared in 1952 by the Supreme Court's decision upholding the right to freedom of speech.

Plot

Episode one: The Human Voice
An unnamed woman, desperate and alone in her apartment, is having one last conversation with her former lover over the telephone. He asks her to return their letters to him. During their conversation, which is repeatedly interrupted, it is revealed that the man left her for another woman, and that she has just attempted suicide out of grief. As a last favour, she begs him not to take her successor to the same hotel in Marseilles where she and he had once stayed.

Episode two: The Miracle
Nannina, a simple-minded and obsessively religious woman, tends goats at the Amalfi coast. When a handsome bearded wanderer passes, she takes him to be Saint Joseph. Offering his flask of wine, he gets her drunk and she falls asleep. When she awakens, he is gone and she is convinced that his appearance was a miracle. A few months later, when she faints in an orchard, the women who help her discover that she is pregnant. Nannina believes this is another miracle, but to the townspeople she becomes a figure of ridicule, so she flees into the mountains. A single goat leads her to an empty church, where she gives birth to her child.

Cast
 Anna Magnani – The woman/Nannina
 Federico Fellini – The wanderer

Production and release
While Rossellini was preparing his next film, Germany, Year Zero, Anna Magnani suggested to the director to adapt Cocteau's play The Human Voice which she had already performed on stage in 1942. Rossellini agreed and, because he and Magnani were staying in Paris at the time, filmed the first episode in a studio in Paris with a French crew. In order to enable the short film a regular release, Rossellini had Federico Fellini script a second piece for Magnani, based on Valle-Inclán's novel Flor de santidad, which Rossellini turned into a screenplay with Tullio Pinelli.

L'Amore premiered at the Venice Film Festival on 21 August 1948 and was released in cinemas in Rome on 2 November the same year. Reactions to the film were mostly negative; even French critic André Bazin, usually supportive of Rossellini's work, accused the first episode of "cinematic laziness".

US censorship lawsuit
For the 1950 New York premiere, The Miracle was removed from L'amore and placed in a three-part anthology film called The Ways of Love with two other short films, Jean Renoir's A Day in the Country (1936) and Marcel Pagnol's Jofroi (1933). While Rossellini's film had passed Italian censors without complaints, its New York screening  was condemned by the National Legion of Decency and Catholic authorities for blasphemy. As a result, the city authorities revoked the license for the film's screening. Distributor Joseph Burstyn appealed the revocation in a lawsuit "Joseph Burstyn, Inc. v. Wilson", which was finally heard at the U.S. Supreme Court. In its May 1952 decision, the Court upheld Burstyn's appeal, declaring that the film was a form of artistic expression protected by the freedom of speech guarantee in the First Amendment to the United States Constitution.

Awards
 1949: Nastro d'Argento (Silver Ribbon) for Best Actress Anna Magnani by the Italian National Syndicate of Film Journalists
 1950: New York Film Critics Circle Award for Best Foreign Language Film

References

External links
 

Films based on works by Jean Cocteau
Films directed by Roberto Rossellini
Italian anthology films
Works subject to a lawsuit
1940s Italian-language films
Films set in the Amalfi Coast
Italian drama films
1948 drama films
Italian black-and-white films
Films scored by Renzo Rossellini
1940s Italian films